KWIX (1230 AM) is a radio station broadcasting a news talk format. Licensed to Moberly, Missouri, United States, the station serves the Moberly area.  The station is currently owned by Alpha Media, through licensee Alpha Media Licensee LLC and features programming from CBS News Radio, NBC News Radio, Compass Media Networks, and Westwood One.

Throughout the day the on-air programmers who can be heard on KWIX include, Brad Boyer, Bill Peterson, Brad Tregnago, Aaron Wood, Eric Messersmith, Brian Hauswirth, Matt Tarnawa, Matt Elliott, Brennan Holtzclaw, Dan Patterson and Curt Derr.

In the early 1990s, KWIX-KRES radio's on-air staff included St. Louis-area transplants such as Bryan Polcyn, Doug Stewart, Mike Roberts and Paul Lewandowski.

This is a reassignment of a callsign.  The original KWIX was a shortwave radio station based in San Francisco, California, commissioned by the federal government in World War II.  It served as the basis for what later became the Voice of America.

Ownership
On March 1, 2007, it was announced that GoodRadio.TV LLC plans to buy The Shepherd Group of radio stations in Missouri.  The Shepherd Group operates 16 small-market radio stations in Missouri.  The deal was reportedly worth $30.6 million.

Dean Goodman recently formed the new company, GoodRadio.TV.  He is the former president and chief executive officer of the television broadcasting company ION Media Networks Inc.  Goodman stepped down from ION Media Networks in October 2006.

The Shepherd Group includes KJEL-FM and KBNN-AM in Lebanon; KJFF-AM in Festus; KREI-AM and KTJJ-FM in Farmington; KRES-FM and KWIX-AM in Moberly; KIRK-FM in Macon; KOZQ-AM, KOZQ-FM, KJPW and KFBD-FM in Waynesville; KAAN-FM and KAAN-AM in Bethany; and KMRN-AM and KKWK-FM in Cameron.

In December 2013, GoodRadio.TV merged into Digity, LLC. Effective February 25, 2016, Digity and its 124 radio stations were acquired by Alpha Media for $264 million.

References

External links

WIX
Alpha Media radio stations